Hypoplesia is a genus of moths belonging to the family Tineidae.

Species
Hypoplesia busckiella (Dietz, 1905) (=Myrmecozela respersa Meyrick, 1919)
Hypoplesia dietziella Busck, 1913

References

Tineidae
Tineidae genera